Ambassador Deepak Kishinchand Bhojwani joined the Indian Foreign Service in 1978 as a trained diplomat. He has served as ambassador in seven Latin American countries, being resident ambassador in Colombia (2007-2010), Venezuela (2003-2006) and Cuba (2010-2013), as well as serving as Consul General in São Paulo, Brazil (-2003).  In 1994 he was picked by Indian Prime Minister Narasimha Rao to serve as his Private Secretary and served under the Prime Minister during India's economic reform period Chawla, Prabhu where the country opened its economy to foreign Investors and relaxed regulation. The Ambassador has also served his country as a Diplomat in the Indian Embassies of Indonesia, Malaysia, Spain and the Czech Republic as a lower level functionary.

Experience
During his professional career, Ambassador Deepak Bhojwani has advised and guided several state-owned and private Indian companies looking to enter the Latin American Market. Such companies include ONGC Videsh Limited, Bajaj Auto and Praj Industries amongst others.  In addition, he has worked alongside several Latin American leaders in areas ranging from bilateral co-operation to formation of foreign policy, some of whom still remain in power such as Venezuela's Hugo Chávez, Ecuador's Rafael Correa, the Dominican Republic's Leonel Fernandez and Colombia's current President Juan Manuel Santos.

The Ambassador has played a vital role in strengthening the relationship between India and Latin America where he has served for over a decade, from 2000 till 2012. His experience in Latin America made him somewhat of an expert on the region within the Indian Foreign Service. He has worked extensively on projects of political, economic, commercial and social nature in Brazil, Venezuela, Colombia, Ecuador, Costa Rica, Cuba, The Dominican Republic and Haiti in addition to collaborating on projects with other countries in and around the region. Among these was the opening of a Center for Information Technology in the Dominican Republic in 2011, financed by the Indian Government.

Ambassador Bhojwani also served as a diplomat performing political, economic, commercial, cultural, consular, and administrative functions in Indian diplomatic Missions in Spain, Indonesia, Malaysia, and the Czech Republic, before serving in Latin America, in the course of his career, from which he retired on 31 January 2012. He also represented his country and government on various delegations in multilateral and bilateral discussions, conferences, etc.

He served in different capacities in New Delhi, the capital of India. His most distinguished designation was Private Secretary to the Prime Minister of India, Mr P.V.Narasimha Rao, from May 1994 till May 1996. Deepak Bhojwani was hand-picked by Prime Minister Rao for his diplomatic and political skills, to serve as a liaison with government departments and functionaries, to oversee appointments and schedules as well as important files relating to key decisions of the government of the day, to accompany the Prime Minister on visits abroad and during high level visits by international dignitaries and delegations to India. This provided an opportunity for him to interact with important personalities and put him at the heart on Indian diplomacy and decision making during the crucial period of India's economic reform and transformation into a global power.

Earlier Deepak Bhojwani served as Private Secretary in the office of Mr K. R. Narayanan, when the latter was Minister of State for External Affairs in the government of India, from October 1985 till September 1986, and then 
Minister of State for Science and Technology, from September 1986 till March 1988. He also served in the Ministry of External Affairs of the government of India from August 1982 till September 1985, April 1988 till July 1990, and July 1996 till July 1997, in the Departments of Administration, Americas, and West Asia and North Africa, giving him a breadth of experience in the working of the Ministry of External Affairs and Indian diplomacy.

Ambassador Bhojwani served as Independent Director on the Board of Bharat Petroleum Corporation Ltd. (BPCL) from November 2016 till November 2018. BPCL was one of the top 10 companies by net worth and turnover in India. He was appointed in September 2018 Independent Director on the Board of Transrail Lighting Ltd. a company that manufactures and undertakes EPC contracts for power transmission, railway lighting and other applications in the transmission sector.

Since January 2017 he is a Director on the Board of, and Country Manager Magotteaux Industries Pvt. Ltd. in engineering and materials for the cement, mining and coal power generation sectors.

Ambassador Bhojwani runs a consultancy to advise and link business and individuals in Latin America and the Caribbean with Indian counterparts. The consultancy is called LATINDIA.

Early life
Deepak Bhojwani was born on 26 January 1952 in the city of Mumbai to Jeweller Kishinchand Bhojwani. He grew up in the Churchgate area of South Mumbai and completed his primary education at St. Xavier's Boys Academy in Mumbai. He went on to earn a bachelor's degree in commerce and economics in 1976 and later a bachelor's degree in law (with a specialization in international law) in 1979, from the University of Mumbai.
After his secondary education he went to work in his father's jewellery business but his desire to serve his community and country led him to seek a post in the Indian Civil Service. He excelled in the competitive entrance exam in 1977, ranking 13th all-India, and joined the Indian Foreign Service in July 1978 as an IFS-A officer, specialised in the French Language. His training included periods in rural India, border areas, and specialised institutions all over India. His first foreign post was in the Embassy of India in Madrid, where he learned Spanish and acquired his first glimpse of Latin culture.

Family
Deepak Bhojwani is married to Shyella Bhojwani, and together they have three children, Mihir, Samir and Sahir. His family has accompanied him on most of his diplomatic posts during his tenure as a diplomat. Mihir is married. Samir is currently living in Latin America, while Sahir lives in the US.

Publications
In addition to his diplomatic duties, Ambassador Deepak Bhojwani published several papers and conducted a host of seminars on Latin America-India relations in English and Spanish. These include:

Where is India Heading in the 21st Century? Keynote Address at the University of Los Andes, Mérida, Venezuela, June 2006.

Democracy and Development in India in the Context of Her Relations with Latin America. Papeles de la India Vol. 37, No.1, 2008– Indian Council for Cultural Relations.

Latin America- Energizing India. Published in Economic Diplomacy by  the think tank CUTS New Delhi, India, 2010.

'Interplay of Culture and Language in the 	Economic Relationship between India and Latin America': Lecture at seminar University of Hyderabad, India, March 2013.

'Development of Democracy and democracy of Development: IBSA and BRICS in the New World' Lecture at seminar 'IBSA Local Governance Forum, Institute for Social Studies, New Delhi, India April 2013

India: Un Socio en el Sur (India: A Partner in the South), Digital Presentation on the Indian Economy and its relationship with Latin America, exhibited in Venezuela, Colombia, Cuba, Dominican Republic and other countries, and at a special seminar at the Observatorio América Latina Asia Pacífico, Montevideo, Uruguay, June 2014.

'Latin America and India: Potential and Opportunities' paper presented at a seminar at the UN Economic Commission for Latin America and the Caribbean (ECLAC) in Santiago, Chile, July 2015.

Author of 'Latin America, the Caribbean and India: Promise and Challenge' a book sponsored by the Indian Council of World Affairs and published by Pentagon Press in India in February 2015.

He has been interviewed extensively in the Indian and Latin American media, mainly on relations between India and the different countries of the region.

Interests 
The Ambassador is a dedicated practitioner of Yoga. He is also a keen golfer. He speaks English, Hindi, Sindhi, Spanish, French and Portuguese.

References 

Praj recibe un contrato por 22 millones de dólares para construir una planta de etanol en Colombia
Embajada de la India, Colombia
Chawla, Prabhu. "The Mole Controversy" OpenDocument, India Today
One India News. "Deepak Bhojwani concurrently accredited ambassador to Ecuador."
Indian Embassy in Havanna
Relaciones India Republica Dominicana
India respalda proceso de cambios en Venezuela
Consul Gerenal Concludes his term in Brazil

1952 births
Living people
Politicians from Mumbai
Ambassadors of India to Venezuela
Ambassadors of India to Cuba
Ambassadors of India to Ecuador
Ambassadors of India to the Dominican Republic
Ambassadors of India to Colombia
Sindhi people